The 2012 Cachantún Cup was a professional tennis tournament played on clay courts. It was the seventh edition of the tournament which was part of the 2012 ATP Challenger Tour. It took place in Santiago, Chile between 5 and 11 March.

ATP entrants

Seeds

 1 Rankings are as of February 27, 2012.

Other entrants
The following players received wildcards into the singles main draw:
  Christian Garin
  Gonzalo Lama
  Matías Sborowitz
  Agustín Velotti

The following players received entry as an alternate into the singles main draw:
  Sebastián Decoud

The following players received entry as a special exempt into the singles main draw:
  Guido Pella

The following players received entry from the qualifying draw:
  Maximiliano Estévez
  Leonardo Kirche
  Fernando Romboli
  Cristóbal Saavedra-Corvalán

Champions

Singles

 Paul Capdeville def.  Antonio Veić, 6–3, 6–7(5–7), 6–3

Doubles

 Paul Capdeville /  Marcel Felder def.  Jorge Aguilar /  Daniel Garza, 6–7(3–7), 6–4, [10–7]

External links
Official website
ITF Search
ATP official site

Cachantun Cup
Cachantún Cup (ATP)
Cachantun Cup